Intersex is a general term for an organism that has sex characteristics that intermediate between male and female. The term intersex typically applies to abnormal members of gonochoric species that are usually sterile. It is not to be confused with the term hermaphrodite.

Intersexuality has been reported in mammals, fishes, nematodes, and  crustaceans.

Mammals 
Intersex can also occur in non-human mammals such as pigs, with it being estimated that 0.1% to 1.4% of pigs are intersex. In Vanuatu, Narave pigs are sacred intersex pigs that are found on Malo Island. An analysis of Navare pig mitochondrial DNA by Lum et al. (2006) found that they are descended from Southeast Asian pigs.

Depending on the definition, the prevalence of intersex among humans have been reported to be about 0.018%.

Nematodes 
Intersex is known to occur in all main groups of  nematodes. Most of them are functionally female. Male intersexes with female characteristics have been reported but are less common.

Fishes 
Gonadal intersex also occurs in fishes, where the individual has both ovarian and testicular tissue. Although it is a rare anomaly among gonochoric fishes, it is a transitional state in fishes that are protandric or protogynous. Intersexuality has been reported in 23 fish families.

Crustaceans 
The oldest evidence for intersexuality in crustaceans comes from fossils dating back 70 million years ago. Intersex has been reported in gonochoric crustaceans as early as 1729. A large amount of literature exists on intersexuality for isopoda and amphipoda, with there being reports of both intersex males and intersex females.

See also
 Hermaphrodite
 Sex
 Sexual differentiation
Gynandromorphism

References 

Intersex
Biology
Humans
Mammals
Fish
Nematodes
Crustaceans
Isopoda
Amphipoda